António José de Sousa Barroso  (5 November 1854 – 31 August 1918) was a Portuguese missionary and prelate of the Catholic Church, who was Prelate of Mozambique from 1891 to 1897, Bishop of Saint Thomas of Mylapore from 1897 to 1899, and thence Bishop of Porto until his death.

The cause for his canonization was officially opened in 1992 by Archbishop Júlio Tavares Rebimbas. In June 2017, Pope Francis officially recognized a decree from the Congregation for the Causes of Saints stating that he lived a life of "heroic virtues" — a major step towards beatification — and he is now referred to as "Venerable".

Distinctions

National orders
 Grand Cross of the Order of Christ
 Grand Cross of the Order of the Immaculate Conception of Vila Viçosa (1886)

References

External links
 

1854 births
1918 deaths
19th-century venerated Christians
20th-century venerated Christians
Bishops of Porto
People from Barcelos, Portugal
Roman Catholic missionaries in Africa
Roman Catholic missionaries in India
Venerated Catholics by Pope Francis